Vanya Petkova (July 10, 1944 – April 26, 2009) was a Bulgarian poet, novelist, short story writer, and translator of Bulgarian, Ukrainian and Greek descent.

Petkova is widely regarded as one of the most consequential Eastern European poets, with 34 poetry books and 6 novels to her name. Her poetry has been translated to 13 languages, including English, Spanish, French, Russian, Greek, Armenian, Polish, Czech, Hindi, Arabic and Japanese among others.

Petkova worked as a cultural envoy for Bulgaria's diplomatic mission to Havana, Cuba from 1974 to 1978 where she learned Spanish and received her PhD in Latin American Culture and Literature, shortly after majoring in German at the University of Sofia. She also studied Arabic in Damascus, Syria, and has also worked as a diplomatic interpreter at the Bulgarian Embassy in Khartoum, Sudan. Vanya Petkova has translated the work of a number of Western and Middle Eastern writers to Bulgarian and was a member of the European Writers' Council.

Nicknamed "The Amazon of Bulgarian Literature" by critics, Vanya Petkova is widely considered to be the most cosmopolitan poet in the Balkans. She was fluent in seven languages and her work has notably spread throughout five continents and was translated to thirteen languages.

Life

Family history 
Born on July 10, 1944, during the immediate aftermath of the air Bombing of Sofia in World War II, to her father Peter – a son of Russian-Ukrainian immigrants, and to her mother Vassilisa – a half-Greek, half-Bulgarian tailor. Her grandfather Ivan Skander was an army general of Russian-Circassian descent who served under Tsar Nicholas II, and left Russia for Bulgaria shortly after the start of the Russian Civil War of 1917 as part of the white émigré, along with his wife – Ukrainian countess Anastasia Zhitskaya, Petkova's paternal grandmother. In the early days of Petkova's career, these facts allegedly served as the main reason for a ban imposed on her poetry by Bulgaria's Communist Party, although the official explanation was "due to erotic content found in her poems". The ban was later lifted because of Petkova's growing popularity in the country.

Literary career 
Petkova's literary debut was in 1959, when her original poem followed by an essay were published in a local newspaper. In 1965 her first book titled Salty Winds was published, and between 1966 and 1973 she worked as editor and editor-in-chief for Bulgarian newspapers Slaveyche and Literaturen Front. She also worked as a translator at the Bulgarian Embassy in Khartoum, Sudan – the homeland of her future husband Dr. Nouri Sadiq Oraby, PhD, a Sudanese geography teacher of Nubian descent, whom she married in 1966.

In 1967 they had their only child Olga-Jacqueline. The same year, Petkova published her second poetry book titled Bullets In The Sand, followed by her third and most popular piece The Sinner, which was subsequently banned by the Bulgarian Communist Party because of the verse "There! Sinner –  I am! I say what I think and kiss whose lips I desire, and eyes as azure as lakes, and eyes as dark as hazelnut I besplotch." Petkova was accused of "anti-communist propaganda and incitement of immoral behavior". The ban would be lifted a year later because of Petkova's growing popularity in the country. The book was issued a year later without censorship, lifting Petkova's popularity in the country to the highest levels in the late 60s and yearly 70s.

Petkova majored in Slavic Philology at the University of Sofia with a minor in German, followed by a subsequent diplomatic career as Bulgaria's cultural envoy to Cuba, where Petkova would learn Spanish and later specialize in Latin American studies at the Jose Marti Institute of Foreign Languages in Havana from 1974 to 1978.

Although mostly known for her romantic poetry, Vanya Petkova frequently used her artistic skills in the fight against the injustice done towards people of color, becoming an important voice against racism and xenophobia in Eastern Europe among artists. In her poem titled Ray Charles, dedicated to the legendary American musician Ray Charles, Petkova writes: "Talk to me of Ray Charles' America, that of the colored, of whose love I have born! And let the Blacks' deep voices keep blessing you all, when white America someday bursts open aflame! And when that happens my dear – Wide open your arms and better tell me the story of Ray Charles!" . It is reported that Petkova had close ties with American social activist Angela Davis, former Palestinian President and Nobel Peace Prize winner Yasser Arafat, writers Pablo Neruda, William Saroyan, and South African singer Miriam Makeba amongst others.

From 1992 until 1997, Petkova lived in Ukraine – her paternal grandmother's homeland. While in Odessa, she translated the work of a number of Ukrainian writers and poets to Bulgarian, and began writing her autobiographical novel, titled God is Love, which remained unfinished.

In 1999, Petkova moved to Ezerovo, a Bulgarian village in the Rhodope mountains region, where she spent the last 10 years of her lifetime until 2009, and where she created her last work, among which the short novel We Are Also Bulgaria, and her last collection of poems titled Pirate Poems – dedicated to American actor and musician Johnny Depp.

Petkova's house is Ezerovo has been turned into a symbolic museum of her legacy and is taken care of by her daughter and grandchildren.

Notable awards and achievements 
Petkova has conducted over 800 stage performances all over the world, including two on board a flying passenger airplane en route from Sofia to Moscow in 1983, for which her name was submitted to the Guinness World Records, and remains the only poet in history to ever do it.

Vanya Petkova is considered to be the only Bulgarian poet with an official phonograph record titled Vanya Petkova Poems, which was released in 1982 by Bulgaria's largest distributor at the time – Balkanton. The vinyl consists of poems recited by the author herself.

Vanya Petkova is also the author of a number of song lyrics, including Disco by Bulgarian rock and roll band Trick with lead singer Etienne Levy, Younga's Love by Margaret Nikolova, and the symbolic anthem of the Armenian Community in Bulgaria titled Armenian Eyes and composed by Haygashot Agasyan.

Petkova was given the title Honorary Citizen of the City of Yerevan in Armenia, with gratitude for her contribution to strengthening the Bulgarian-Armenian cultural relations.

Less than a decade later, in 1991, Petkova was officially featured in the second volume of the American Encyclopedia of Continental Women Writers, alongside Bulgaria's Elisaveta Bagryana and Blaga Dimitrova.

In 2005 Vanya Petkova was awarded with Bulgaria's Georgi Jagarov National Literary Award.

In 2011 Vanya Petkova's name was posthumously featured in the ninth volume of the National Encyclopedia Bulgaria, published by BAS.

In 2019, Vanya Petkova was posthumously awarded the honorary title "Unifier of Cultures" by the Bulgarian Union of Spanish-speaking Journalists.

During her life-long journey, she got to personally know the likes of William Saroyan, Bulat Okudzhava, Yasser Arafat, Che Guevara's father Ernesto Guevara Lynch, Fidel Castro, Yevgeny Yevtushenko, Angela Davis, and Miriam Makeba among others.

Petkova's last book in her lifetime would become Pirate Poems (2009) –  a compilation of her most notable work with five additional newly written poems, two of which were written in English by Petkova herself, and dedicated to American actor Johnny Depp. The book Pirate Poems itself was also dedicated to Johnny Depp – the screen actor Vanya Petkova admired most, as claimed by her family. The book was republished in 2021 by her grandson, actor Joseph Al Ahmad, in the United States.

A year after Petkova's passing, in November 2010, the bilingual book An Armenian Song was issued with the assistance of the Armenian Embassy in Bulgaria, becoming the first posthumous book by Petkova. The official premiere of its publication was held on December 2, 2010, at Saint Cyril and Methodius National Library in Sofia.

Death 
A week after publishing what would become her last book during her lifetime – Pirate Poems;

On April 26, 2009, aged 64, Petkova died from cardiac arrest in the small Bulgarian town of Parvomay, located in the Rhodope Mountains. She would be laid to rest days later at Bulgaria's Central Sofia Cemetery.

Petkova's memorial service was held on April 29, 2009, at Central Sofia Cemetery in the Bulgarian capital Sofia, with her husband Nouri, daughter Olga-Jacqueline, grandchildren Joseph and Nasser, friends, colleagues and admirers of her poetry all present. Petkova's resting site is in the Notable Figures' quarter at Central Sofia Cemetery Park.

In the preface taken from Pirate Poems she writes:

"My poems – why have I called them “Pirate”? Because all of them have been stolen from the meager moments of joy and happiness in my wild and turbulent life. My poetry wasn’t born under the warm bedsheets in front of a computer. It was born in between face slaps and fistfights, gunshots and knife-throws, handcuffs and bloodstains, daring escapes followed by chases, desert adventures in Syria and Sudan, between airplanes and high speeds, steamboats and horse rides, thugs and their prostitutes, between outrageous children and ungrateful darlings, between Heaven and Earth,
between Life and Death. Born to Pirates, I lived like a Pirate and Piracy is in my blood." 

–Vanya Petkova, (1944 - 2009)

Memorials 
Vanya Petkova House and Museum

Vanya Petkova's house, located in Ezerovo (Lakeville) – a small village in the Bulgarian Rhodope Mountains region, where Petkova wrote much of her work, and where she spent the last years of her life from 1999 to 2009, has been turned into a symbolic museum celebrating her life and artistic career. In the summer of 2021, the Palestinian Embassy in Bulgaria contributed to the museum by giving a small fountain with traditional ornaments, which was placed outside the main fence. All of Petkova's memorabilia including awards, journals, private diaries, unwritten work, paintings, dresses from her performances, and personal typewriters are all displayed inside. The museum house is currently being renovated, with an expected official opening to be held in 2024 by Petkova's family, as mentioned in a 2021 op-ed by her daughter, Bulgarian journalist Olia Al-Ahmed.

Notable work 
 1965 – Salty Winds
 1967 – Bullets in the Sand
 1967 – Attraction
 1967 – The Sinner
 1968 – Nunche, Grandpa Kachi's Granddaughter
 1968 – Contemporary Arab Poets, an anthology
 1970 – Prediction
 1972 – The Black Dove
 1973 – Chestnut Love
 1973 – Oli, Oli, Snail
 1976 – Return River
 1979 – The Vow of Silence,
 1980 – Venceremos - lyrical essays on Cuba,
 1980 – The Blue Book
 1981 – Triptych
 1981 – In the battle between the two worlds. Documents. Volume II (co-author),
 1984 – Thunder
 1984 – Gypsy Romance
 1988 – Earthquake
 1989 – Forgiveness
 2005 – Passions
 2006 – The Sinner 1 - remake
 2008 – The Sinner 2 - remake
 2008 – Topics and essays in literature. - a series of topics and essays for Bulgarian students from 9th to 12th grade (co-author).
 2009 – Pirate Poems - dedicated to Johnny Depp.
 2009 – The Golden Apple - the last translation from Ukrainian, love lyrics by Dmitry Pavlichko.
 2010 – Armenian Song - a collection of poems in two languages published by Demax with the assistance of the Armenian Embassy in Bulgaria. The premiere was held on December 2, 2010, at the National Library in Sofia. The poet's daughter - journalist and translator Olya Al-Ahmed is the compiler and author of the foreword, the design is by Vanya Petkova's grandson - Joseph Al Ahmad.
 2012 – And We Are Bulgaria - a series of short stories and novels.
 2021 – Pirate Poems by Vanya Petkova - the American edition of Pirate Poems (2009), republished in Los Angeles, California, by Vanya Petkova's grandson - Joseph Al Ahmad, and dedicated to actor Johnny Depp.
source:

References

External links

https://www.yerevan.am/en/honorary-titles-of-yerevan/ 
https://books.google.bg/books?id=ncN7uneLKrcC&hl=bg&source=gbs_similarbooks
Archives of Bulgarian National Radio https://archives.bnr.bg/vanya-petkova-edna-kosmopolitna-lichnost-v-balgarskata-poeziya-i-prevodnata-literatura/

1944 births
2009 deaths
20th-century Bulgarian poets
Bulgarian translators
Bulgarian journalists
Bulgarian women journalists
Bulgarian women poets
20th-century women writers
20th-century Bulgarian women writers
20th-century Bulgarian writers
20th-century translators
20th-century journalists